Mohamed Bin Zayed University of Artificial Intelligence (MBZUAI) is a graduate-level, research-based academic institution located in Abu Dhabi, United Arab Emirates. The current president, Professor Eric Xing, joined in January 2021. Sir J. Michael Brady served as the founding, interim president.

The establishment of MBZUAI is part of the United Arab Emirates strategy for Artificial Intelligence 2031, for which came the appointment of the world's first Minister of State for Artificial Intelligence.

As of June 2022, MBZUAI ranks 127th globally among institutions that conduct research in computer science according to CSRankings. In artificial intelligence, computer vision, machine learning, and natural language processing specifically the university ranks 30th globally.

The university provides admitted students with a full scholarship, including benefits such as a monthly allowance, health insurance, and accommodation. The university also secures internships by working with local and global companies. The initial class of graduate students were slated to start coursework in September 2020, but due to the COVID-19 pandemic coursework began in January 2021.

Academics
MBZUAI seeks to empower a new generation of all AI leaders through exceptional education and a unique model of academia. The university offers graduate-level students a range of postgraduate degrees, focusing on core components of the AI industry: Computer Vision, Machine Learning, and Natural Language Processing. MBZUAI offers graduate-level degrees that are research-intensive and focused on practical AI. The university has the following programs:

Professional Services

In October 2021, the university launched an Executive Program  aimed at supporting decision makers to implement AI solutions in their organizations.  

The MBZUAI Executive Program includes: 

 Pieter Abbeel - the University of California, Berkeley
 Sir J. Michael Brady - the University of Oxford
 Justine Cassell - Paris AI Research Institute (PRAIRIE)
 Michael I. Jordan - the University of California, Berkeley
 Thomas Mitchell - Carnegie Mellon University
 David Parkes - Harvard University
 Daniela Rus - Massachusetts Institute of Technology (MIT)

In March 2022, the university graduated the first class of Executive Program participants. A second class was announced in March 2022 by President Eric Xing.

Research
The university serves as a hub for AI research and education and aims to be an epicenter of AI innovation by finding solutions to the world's most pressing challenges. Moreover, as a new institution, the university's ambition is to become the go-to place for government and enterprises when seeking AI expertise, solutions or advice.

See also
 List of universities in the United Arab Emirates
 Education in the United Arab Emirates

References

2019 establishments in the United Arab Emirates
Educational institutions established in 2019
Universities and colleges in the Emirate of Abu Dhabi
Scientific organisations based in the United Arab Emirates
Artificial intelligence associations